Yaroslav Valeryevich Voronkov (born 11 September 2003) is a Russian football player. He plays for FC SKA Rostov-on-Don.

Club career
He made his debut in the Russian Football National League for FC SKA-Khabarovsk on 5 September 2021 in a game against FC Spartak-2 Moscow.

References

External links
 
 
 Profile by Russian Football National League

2003 births
Footballers from Luhansk
Ukrainian emigrants to Russia
Living people
Russian footballers
Association football defenders
FC SKA Rostov-on-Don players
FC SKA-Khabarovsk players
FC Baltika Kaliningrad players
Russian Second League players
Russian First League players